Jérémy Mathieu (born 29 October 1983) is a French professional footballer who plays as a centre-back or a left-back for Régional 2 club Luynes Sports.

Mathieu made 172 Ligue 1 appearances across seven seasons, split equally between Sochaux and Toulouse. He played five seasons in La Liga with Valencia before joining Barcelona in 2014, where he won the treble in his first season.

An international for France from 2011 to 2016, Mathieu was selected in the squad to represent France at UEFA Euro 2016 but dropped out with injury.

Club career

Sochaux
Born in Luxeuil-les-Bains, Haute-Saône, Mathieu started his career with the biggest club in the Franche-Comté region, Sochaux. When he was 16 AC Milan was interested in signing him, but Sochaux's coach Jean Fernandez advised him to stay because mentally he still wasn't strong enough.

He made his Ligue 1 debut, during the 2002–03 season, in a league match against Sedan coming on as a late-match substitute. Despite being 18, he was inserted into the starting 11, and quickly provided an impact scoring his first professional goal in just his third league match in a 2–2 draw against Stade Rennais. He made 23 league appearances that season scoring four goals, which included an equalising goal against Paris Saint-Germain, and two game-winning goals against Nantes and Le Havre. His play, along with the team itself, was a main factor in the club finishing 5th and qualifying for the UEFA Cup.

Over the next two seasons, Mathieu continued his great form appearing in 63 league matches and scoring six league goals. He also performed well in Europe appearing in 14 matches and scoring two goals. He also helped Sochaux win the Coupe de la Ligue in 2004. His performances at Sochaux led to strong interest from Italian club Juventus, English clubs Newcastle United, Everton, and Southampton.

Toulouse

After announcing his desire to move to another club and only having one year left on his current deal, Sochaux agreed to listen to offers for the player. Eventually, he agreed to join Toulouse after agreeing to a four-year deal. He made his league debut for Toulouse against his former club Sochaux playing the full 90 minutes in a 1–0 victory. He continued this positive play appearing in 36 league matches and scoring two goals against AC Ajaccio and Troyes. The following season, he made 32 league appearances and score another two goals helping Toulouse qualify for the UEFA Champions League. However, both Mathieu and Toulouse had a horrible 2007–08 season with Mathieu fracturing a bone in his foot, which forced him to miss half the season, and Toulouse finishing just one spot short of relegation. This led to Mathieu pondering his future with the Midi-Pyrénées-based side.

Despite heavy interest from Italian side Roma and other Italian outfits, Toulouse refused to budge with efforts to get Mathieu to remain at the club. Mathieu responded by turning down a contract extension, which effectively allowed him to leave on a free transfer at the end of the 2008–09 season. Eventually it was agreed by Toulouse and Mathieu that the player would see out the season at Toulouse, after Toulouse turned down a €4.5 million move to Bordeaux.

Despite the ongoing transfer situation, Mathieu remained civil in regards to playing. He made 31 league appearances during the 2008–09 season, contributing to Toulouse's successful league campaign, as well as the team's success in the Coupe de France, where they were eliminated in the semi-finals by the eventual champions Guingamp.

Valencia
On 10 June 2009, Mathieu signed for La Liga club Valencia on a three-year contract. The transfer came into effect on 1 July 2009. He made his debut for the club in a 2–0 win over Sevilla FC.

On 1 May 2014, Mathieu looked to have scored the goal to send Valencia through to the 2014 UEFA Europa League Final when he scored off of Ricardo Costa's lay-off, making the score 3−0 against Sevilla (3−2 on aggregate) but Stéphane Mbia scored a 94th-minute header to win the semi-final on away goals for the Andalusian side. Three days later, Mathieu headed in a corner to send Valencia into a 1−0 lead at the Santiago Bernabéu but Real Madrid battled back to secure a 2−2 draw as Valencia conceded another late stoppage time goal.

Barcelona

On 23 July 2014, Mathieu signed a contract with La Liga club Barcelona for the next four seasons, with an optional season. The cost of the transfer was €20 million and the buyout clause was set at €50 million. Mathieu claims that he would rather have stayed as Valencia's captain rather than risking "polishing the bench" in Barcelona but that he decided to move after Valencia's chairman Amadeo Salvo rejected his demand for an intermediate figure between his pay in Valencia and Barcelona's proposal.

On 15 January 2015, he scored his first goal for Barcelona in a 4–0 Copa del Rey away win against Elche (9–0 on aggregate) from a free kick. Mathieu scored his first La Liga goal for the club against rivals Real Madrid in a 2–1 El Clásico win at Camp Nou on 22 March 2015. In the team's next fixture, Mathieu scored the only goal in a 1–0 win at Celta Vigo, to keep his team four points clear at the top of the league. These two winning goals were important for the attainment of Barcelona's 23rd League title, as the team won it by a 2-point advantage over Real Madrid.

In the 2015 UEFA Super Cup against Sevilla FC in Tbilisi, he conceded a penalty with a foul on Vitolo, which was converted by Kevin Gameiro as the opponents came from 1–4 down to take the game into extra time; Barcelona nonetheless triumphed 5–4.

Sporting CP
On 7 July 2017, Portuguese club Sporting CP announced the signing of Mathieu on a free transfer for two seasons. He scored his first goal for the club on his sixth appearance, in a 2–0 home win against Tondela. Upon his return to the Camp Nou, Mathieu netted an own goal for Sporting in a 2–0 loss in their final game of the 2017–18 UEFA Champions League groupstage.

On 24 June 2020, Mathieu suffered an injury to his left knee during training, which ultimately put an end to his career.

International career
Mathieu has received caps with all of France's youth teams beginning with the under-15s. Though, he was a regular with the under-21 squad leading up to the 2006 UEFA European Under-21 Championship, he was not selected to participate in the event. He received his first call-up to the senior squad for their friendly against Slovakia. However, he played with the second team, France B, who were playing Slovakia B.

He made his national team debut in a friendly against the United States at the Stade de France on 11 November 2011, playing the full 90 minutes.

Mathieu was named in France's squad for their hosting of UEFA Euro 2016, but dropped out with injury on 28 May, to be replaced by Samuel Umtiti.

Career statistics

Club
Source:

International
Source:

Honours
Sochaux
Coupe de la Ligue: 2003–04

Barcelona
La Liga: 2014–15, 2015–16
Copa del Rey: 2014–15, 2015–16
Supercopa de España: 2016
UEFA Champions League: 2014–15
UEFA Super Cup: 2015
FIFA Club World Cup: 2015

Sporting CP
Taça de Portugal: 2018–19
Taça da Liga: 2017–18, 2018–19

References

External links

1983 births
Living people
People from Luxeuil-les-Bains
Sportspeople from Haute-Saône
French footballers
Association football defenders
FC Sochaux-Montbéliard players
Toulouse FC players
Valencia CF players
FC Barcelona players
Sporting CP footballers
Ligue 1 players
La Liga players
Primeira Liga players
UEFA Champions League winning players
France youth international footballers
France under-21 international footballers
France international footballers
French expatriate footballers
Expatriate footballers in Spain
Expatriate footballers in Portugal
French expatriate sportspeople in Spain
French expatriate sportspeople in Portugal
Footballers from Bourgogne-Franche-Comté